DC to Light is the fourth studio album by American DJ, Morgan Page. It was released on 9 June 2015, via Nettwerk Productions. The album is charted on the Billboard 200, Top Dance/Electronic Albums, Independent Albums and Heatseekers Albums charts.

Background 
The album was recorded using electricity harnessed by solar panels at his home studio. Jon O'Brien of Music Is My Oxygen, reviewed the album as "largely more concerned with massive bass drops, irritating high-pitched synths and generic four-to-the-floor beats".

Track listing

Charts

References 

Morgan Page albums
2015 albums
Nettwerk Records albums